Baucau is the second-largest city in East Timor, after Dili, the capital, which lies  to its west.

Baucau has about 16,000 inhabitants, and is the capital of Baucau municipality, located in the eastern part of the country. In the times of Portuguese Timor, Baucau was little more than an overgrown village, and for part of those times was called Vila Salazar, after the Portuguese dictator António de Oliveira Salazar.

Geography 
The administrative post of Baucau is divided into 11 villages (sucos)

 Suco Bahú
 Suco Bucoli
 Suco Buibau
 Suco Buruma
 Suco Caibada Uaimua
 Suco Samalari
 Suco Seiçal
 Suco Tirilolo
 Suco Triloka
 Suco Gariuai
 Suco Uailili

Infrastructure 

Much of the infrastructure of the city and the surrounding area was damaged or destroyed by pro-Indonesian militia during the violence that followed the referendum for independence in 1999. Nevertheless, in the old part of Baucau there survive a few relics from the Portuguese colonial era, such as large colonial houses, churches, and public buildings. One of these is the Pousada de Baucau, a large pink hotel whose restaurant has views of the ocean.

The shops, restaurants, and street market stalls (predominantly fruit and vegetable sellers) conduct business, although unemployment, particularly among the young, is very high. There are a few successful experiments that have converted old war-oriented businesses into light engineering, new businesses such as East Timor Roofing that has generated employment and training opportunities, and a number of small businesses are beginning in the areas of hygiene and health, food production and processing, transport, small retail, and tourism.  The convent next to the Pousada de Baucau has a small retail outlet selling locally produced hand crafts.

The Instituto Catholico para a Formacao de Professores (ICFP) - the Catholic Teachers College - is owned by the Diocese and is responsible for training future and untrained teachers for Timor-Leste.  With more than 300 graduates teaching throughout the country, and more than 400 teachers with upgraded qualifications, ICFP is dedicated to rebuilding the country through education of future generations.

Baucau also has a hospital, a nursing school and a swimming pool owned by the Pousada de Baucau.

Climate

Religion 

Baucau is the seat of the Roman Catholic Diocese of Baucau, one of the three Bishoprics in East Timor. It was founded on 30 November 1996, when the bishopric in Dili split. Its bishop is Basilio do Nascimento.

Transportation 

Six kilometers from the city lies the Cakung Airport (code IATA: BCH), a.k.a. LANUD for the local people. It has what is currently the country's longest airport runway, as Dili's Lobato International Airport can only serve small aircraft like the Boeing 737. It served as the country's principal airport before the Indonesian invasion in 1975, when it was taken over by the Indonesian military.

See also
Assales Fatumaca

References

Further reading

External links

 
Populated places in East Timor
Baucau Municipality